Sanitary Public Market may refer to:

 Sanitary Market, Pike Place Market, Seattle, Washington, U.S.
 Sanitary Public Market, Sunken Gardens (Florida)